Amédée de Jallais (17 December 1826 – 31 January 1909) was a 19th-century French playwright, operetta librettist and chansonnier.

Biography 
The son of a lieutenant colonel in the guards, he studied at the College Bourbon then entered in the insurance company La Nationale (1845–1850) as employee, a position he will leave to devote himself entirely to literature after the success of his comedy Un de perdu, une de retrouvée.

Collaborator of the Gazette des théâtres, then of the Messager des théâtres, he became managing director of the Théâtre des Délassements-Comiques (1871) then after the blaze of this theatre on 22 May 1871, of the Théâtre des Menus-Plaisirs. Administrator dof the Théâtre Déjazet (1874–1875), general secretary of the Théâtre de la République (1897), he married the actress Eudoxie Laurent in 1862.

He wrote more than two hundred plays which were presented on the most important Parisian stages of the 19th century: Théâtre de la Porte-Saint-Martin, Théâtre du Vaudeville, Théâtre des Folies-Dramatiques etc.

Works 

 Capitaine... de quoi ?, vaudeville in 1 act, with Xavier Eyma, 1850
 Un de perdu, une de retrouvée, comédie-vaudeville in 1 act, 1850
 Le Colporteur, comédie-vaudeville in 2 acts, with Henry Vannoy, 1851
 La Course aux pommes d'or, comédie-vaudeville in 1 act, with Frédérick Lemaître, 1851 
 Les Giboulées, vaudeville un 1 act, with Armand-Numa Jautard, 1851
 Quand on va cueillir la noisette, vaudeville in 1 act, with De Kock, 1851
 Le Renard et les raisins, comédie-vaudeville in 1 act, with Eyma, 1851
 Un Mari tombé des nues, vaudeville in 1 act, 1852
 Une nuit sur la scène, compte mal rendu des Nuits de la Seine, in 2 scenes, with Charles Blondelet, 1852
 Pendant l'orage, comédie-vaudeville in 1 act, 1852
 Le Bonhomme Dimanche, revue-féerique in 4 acts and 20 tableaux, with Charles Potier and Jules Renard, 1853
 Le jour de la blanchisseuse, vaudeville in 1 act, 1853
 Un Pacha dérangé, vaudeville in 1 act, with Gabet, 1853
 Un Pistolet qui ne veut pas partir, vaudeville in 1 act, 1853
 Allez-vous-en, gens de la noce, pochade in 1 act, mingled with couplets, with Charles Gabet, 1854
 Sur la scène et dans la salle miroir des théâtres de Paris, 2 vols., 1854
 Ah ! quel plaisir d'être garçon !, scène de la vie privée, 1854
 Allez aux 500 diables, imbroglio de la féerie des 500 diables, with Cabot, 1854
 L'Alma, à-propos patriotique mingled with couplets, in 2 tableaux, with Adolphe Guénée, 1854
 Sous un bec de gaz, scènes de la vie nocturne, in one night, 1854
 Catastrophe épouvantable arrivée au puisatier Giraud et à son compagnon Jala, with Cabot, 1854
 La Question d'Occident, à propos... de bottes... orné de cuirs et d'un pas presque espagnol, in 1 act, with Édouard Cadol, 1854
 La Corde du pendu, vaudeville in 2 acts, with Charles Cabot and Édouard Cadol, 1854
 La Mauvaise aventure d'une pauvre parfumeuse taillée en pièce pour le théâtre de la Gaîté, with Cabot, 1854
 Jacqueline Doucette, vaudeville in 1 act, with Cabot, 1855
 Nicodème sur la terre, vaudeville in 1 act, with Cabot, 1855
 Le Médecin sans enfants, ou le don Juan de Vincennes et ce qu'on perd quand on a une paire de pères, parody in 2 tableaux, with Cabot, 1855
 Le Boulanger a des écus, drame-vaudeville in 3 acts, with Thiéry, 1856
 Les Cocasseries de la danse, scène comique, 1856
 Estelle et Némorin, bucolique musicale in 1 act, 1856
 Les Mésaventures de Mandrin, méli-méla-mélodrame, with Cabot, 1856
 Le Guetteur de nuit, opérette-bouffe in 1 act, with Léon Beauvallet, 1856
 Madame Roger Bontemps, vaudeville in 1 act, with Clairville, 1856
 Ninon et Ninette, vaudeville in 1 act, with Beauvallet, 1856
 Manon de Nivelle, vaudeville in 3 acts, 1856
 Les Cosaques, drama in 8 tableaux, with Charles Cabot, 1857
 Suivez le monde !, 1857 revue in 3 acts and 20 tableaux, with Ernest Blum and Flan, 1857
 Les Poètes de la treille, song in 3 periods, 1857
 Le Gardien des scellés, vaudeville in 1 act, with Clairville and Mercier, 1857
 Le Poignard de Léonora, play in 2 acts and 4 tableaux, mingled with song, with Clairville, 1857
 Rompons !, opérette-bouffe in 1 act, with Jautard, 1857
 Le Borgne à la représentation de l'Aveugle, ou le Père de l'aveugle aveuglé par un aveuglément aveugle, 1857
 Allez vous asseoir, 1858 revue in 3 acts and 16 tableaux, preceded by As-tu vu la lune ?, prologue in 2 parts, with Jules Renard, 1858
 La Dette de Jacquot, operetta in 1 act, 1858
 Pan, pan ! c'est la fortune !, comedy in 1 act, with Charles Varin and Henri Thiéry, 1858
 Le Roi de la gaudriole, operetta in 1 act, with Charles Bridault and Alexandre Flan, 1858
 Un duo de capons, rencontre nocturne, saynète musicale in 1 act, 1858
 Fra Diavolino, operetta in 1 act, with Charles Bridault, 1858
 Les Talismans de Rosine, vaudeville in 2 acts, with Flan, 1858
 Le Naufrage de La Pérouse,  drama in 5 acts and 9 tableaux, with Adolphe d'Ennery and Thiéry, 1859
 La Course aux canards, vaudeville in 3 canards, with Thiéry, 1859
 Les Premières armes de Fanfan la Tulipe, vaudeville in 1 act, with Clairville, 1859
 Ot' toi d'la !, ronde, 1859
 Les Enfants du travail, pièce populaire mingled with song, in 3 acts and 9 tableaux, with Clairville, 1859
 La Toile, ou Mes quat'sous, revue of 1859, in 3 acts and 20 tableaux, preceded by Le Royaume de Comus, prologue in 2 parts, with Renard, 1859
 Chamarin le chasseur, comédie-vaudeville in 1 act, with Varin and Thiéry, 1860
 La Nouvelle Madame Angot au sérail de Constantinople, play in 3 small acts, 1860
 Les Chasseurs de pigeons, vaudeville in 3 acts, with Paul Avenel, 1860
 Quelle mauvaise farce !, vaudeville in 1 act, with Alexandre Guyon and Gustave Harmant, 1860
 L'histoire d'un drapeau racontée par un zouave, lament in too many couplets, with Cabot, 1860
 Modiste et modeste, vaudeville in 1 act, with Avenel, 1860
 Les Recruteurs, opéra-comique in 3 acts and 4 tableaux, 1861 (with Alphonse Vulpian 1795?-1829)
 Ce Scélérat de Poireau !, vaudeville in 1 act, with Clairville and Pol Mercier, 1862
 Le Minotaure, vaudeville in 1 act, with Clairville and Henry de Kock, 1862
 De Paris en Chine, ou Je ne suis pas Tissier, voyage en 4 stations, with Varin and Thiéry, 1863
 Le Carnaval des canotiers, vaudeville in 4 acts, with Thiéry and Adolphe Dupeuty, 1864
 Le Petit journal, play in 4 acts and 12 tableaux including a prologue, 1864
 On lit dans l'Akhbar..., vaudeville in 1 act, with William Busnach, 1864
 Zut... au berger !, revue de l'année 1864, in 3 acts et 7 tableaux, including a prologue, with Flan, 1864
 En classe ! Mesdemoiselles, folie-vaudeville in 1 act, with Dupeuty, 1864
 Les Supplices des femmes, revue fantaisiste in 3 acts and 6 tableaux, with Victor Koning, 1865
 Les Vieux glaçons, parodie des Vieux garçons , in 2 acts, in 4 tableaux, with Flan, 1865
 L'Événement, grande actualité in 5 acts and 12 tableaux, 1866
 Gabriel Lambert, drama in 5 acts and a prologue, with Alexandre Dumas, 1866
 Nos bonnes villageoises, parody in 2 acts and 3 tableaux, 1866
 La Bonne aventure, ô gué !, revue of the year 1867, in 3 acts and 8 tableaux, 1867
 Le Royaume de la bêtise, fantaisie in 3 acts and 8 tableaux, 1867
 L'Héritage du postillon, opérette in 1 act, with Francis Tourte, 1867
 A la barque, à la barque !, revue of the year 1868, in 3 acts and 10 tableaux, 1868
 La Fleur des saphis, fantaisie-vaudeville in 2 acts, 1869
 La Chiffonnière !, chanson réaliste, 1869
 Madame Angot et ses demoiselles, musical fantasy in 1 act, 1873
 Bobino vit encore, revue in 3 acts, 1873
 Loup, y es-tu ?, great revue of the year 1876, in 4 acts and 8 tableaux, 1876
 Paris-mondain, ronde, 1880
 Fenêtres et jalousies, operetta in 1 act, 1882
 La chanson des Écus, operetta in 1 act, 1883
 Fenêtres et jalousies, operetta en 1 act, 1883
 Une date immortelle !, souvenir d'un grand jour, with Alphonse Lemonnier, 1884
 Le Petit Spahi, operetta, with Louis Péricaud, 1885
 La Question tonkinoise, saynète bouffe, with Péricaud, 1885
 Il reviendra, revue in 3 tableaux of the year 1887, with Guillaume Livet, 1887 
 Les Sabines, operetta in 1 act, 1890
 Confections pour dames, operetta in 1 act, 1899
 Dans la Déche, operetta in 1 act, undated
 Le Médaillon d'Yvonne, opérette de salon in 1 act, undated

Bibliography 
 Edmond Antoine Poinsot, Dictionnaire des pseudonymes, 1869, 
 Pierre Larousse, Grand Dictionnaire universel du XIXe siècle, 1er supplément, 1878
 Henry Lyonnet, Dictionnaire des comédiens français, 1911,

References

External links 

 Amédée de Janllais on Data.bnf.fr
 Photography and biography on artlyrique.fr

19th-century French dramatists and playwrights
French theatre managers and producers
French opera librettists
French chansonniers
People from Saint-Germain-en-Laye
1826 births
1909 deaths